The 2019 Malaysia Masters (officially known as the Perodua Malaysia Masters 2019 presented by Daihatsu for sponsorship reasons) was a badminton tournament that took place at the Axiata Arena in Malaysia from 15 to 20 January 2019 and had a total purse of $350,000.

Tournament
The 2019 Malaysia Masters was the second tournament of the 2019 BWF World Tour and also part of the Malaysia Masters championships, which had been held since 2009. This tournament was organized by the Badminton Association of Malaysia and sanctioned by the BWF.

Venue
This international tournament was held at the Axiata Arena in Kuala Lumpur, Malaysia.

Point distribution
Below is the point distribution table for each phase of the tournament based on the BWF points system for the BWF World Tour Super 500 event.

Prize money
The total prize money for this tournament was US$350,000. Distribution of prize money was in accordance with BWF regulations.

Men's singles

Seeds

 Kento Momota (first round)
 Shi Yuqi (quarter-finals)
 Chen Long (final)
 Son Wan-ho (champion)
 Viktor Axelsen (semi-finals)
 Anthony Sinisuka Ginting (quarter-finals)
 Srikanth Kidambi (quarter-finals)
 Tommy Sugiarto (first round)

Finals

Top half

Section 1

Section 2

Bottom half

Section 3

Section 4

Women's singles

Seeds

 Tai Tzu-ying (quarter-finals)
 Nozomi Okuhara (quarter-finals)
 Akane Yamaguchi (first round)
 Carolina Marín (final)
 He Bingjiao (quarter-finals)
 Ratchanok Intanon (champion)
 Saina Nehwal (semi-finals)
 Sung Ji-hyun (quarter-finals)

Finals

Top half

Section 1

Section 2

Bottom half

Section 3

Section 4

Men's doubles

Seeds

 Marcus Fernaldi Gideon / Kevin Sanjaya Sukamuljo (champions)
 Takeshi Kamura / Keigo Sonoda (quarter-finals)
 Hiroyuki Endo / Yuta Watanabe (quarter-finals)
 Kim Astrup / Anders Skaarup Rasmussen (quarter-finals)
 Fajar Alfian / Muhammad Rian Ardianto (second round) 
 Mohammad Ahsan / Hendra Setiawan (second round)
 Takuto Inoue / Yuki Kaneko (quarter-finals)
 Liao Min-chun / Su Ching-heng (first round)

Finals

Top half

Section 1

Section 2

Bottom half

Section 3

Section 4

Women's doubles

Seeds

 Yuki Fukushima / Sayaka Hirota (champions)
 Misaki Matsutomo / Ayaka Takahashi (semi-finals)
 Mayu Matsumoto / Wakana Nagahara (semi-finals)
 Greysia Polii / Apriyani Rahayu (final)
 Lee So-hee / Shin Seung-chan (withdrew)
 Shiho Tanaka / Koharu Yonemoto (first round)
 Jongkolphan Kititharakul / Rawinda Prajongjai (first round)
 Gabriela Stoeva / Stefani Stoeva (second round)

Finals

Top half

Section 1

Section 2

Bottom half

Section 3

Section 4

Mixed doubles

Seeds

 Yuta Watanabe / Arisa Higashino (champions)
 Dechapol Puavaranukroh / Sapsiree Taerattanachai (final)
 Chan Peng Soon / Goh Liu Ying (semi-finals)
 Chris Adcock / Gabby Adcock (quarter-finals) 
 Goh Soon Huat / Shevon Jemie Lai (quarter-finals)
 Seo Seung-jae / Chae Yoo-jung (quarter-finals)
 Hafiz Faizal / Gloria Emanuelle Widjaja (second round)
 Marcus Ellis / Lauren Smith (first round)

Finals

Top half

Section 1

Section 2

Bottom half

Section 3

Section 4

References

External links
 Tournament Link

Malaysia Masters
Malaysia Masters
Malaysia Masters (badminton)
Mast